Common wheat (Triticum aestivum), also known as bread wheat, is a cultivated wheat species. About 95% of wheat produced worldwide is common wheat; it is the most widely grown of all crops and the cereal with the highest monetary yield.

Taxonomy

Numerous forms of wheat have evolved under human selection. This diversity has led to confusion in the naming of wheats, with names based on both genetic and morphological characteristics.

List of common cultivars 
 Albimonte
 Manital

Phylogeny 
Bread wheat is an allohexaploid  a combination of six sets of chromosomes from different species. Of the six sets of chromosomes, four come from emmer (Triticum turgidum, itself a tetraploid) and two from Aegilops tauschii (a wild diploid goatgrass). Wild emmer arose from an even earlier ploidy event, a tetraploidy between two diploids, wild einkorn (T. urartu) and Ae. speltoides (another wild goatgrass).

Free-threshing wheat is closely related to spelt. As with spelt, genes contributed from Ae. tauschii give bread wheat greater cold hardiness than most wheats, and it is cultivated throughout the world's temperate regions.

Cultivation

History 
Common wheat was first domesticated in Western Asia during the early Holocene, and spread from there to North Africa, Europe and East Asia in the prehistoric period. Naked wheats (including Triticum aestivum, T. durum, and T. turgidum) were found in Roman burial sites ranging from 100BCE to 300CE .

Wheat first reached North America with Spanish missions in the 16th century, but North America's role as a major exporter of grain dates from the colonization of the prairies in the 1870s. As grain exports from Russia ceased in the First World War, grain production in Kansas doubled.

Worldwide, bread wheat has proved well adapted to modern industrial baking, and has displaced many of the other wheat, barley, and rye species that were once commonly used for bread making, particularly in Europe.

Plant breeding 

Modern wheat varieties have been selected for short stems, the result of RHt dwarfing genes
that reduce the plant's sensitivity to gibberellic acid, a plant hormone that lengthens cells. RHt genes were introduced to modern wheat varieties in the 1960s by Norman Borlaug from Norin 10 cultivars of wheat grown in Japan. Short stems are important because the application of high levels of chemical fertilizers would otherwise cause the stems to grow too high, resulting in lodging (collapse of the stems). Stem heights are also even, which is important for modern harvesting techniques.

Other forms of common wheat 

Compact wheats (e.g., club wheat Triticum compactum, but in India T. sphaerococcum) are closely related to common wheat, but have a much more compact ear. Their shorter rachis segments lead to spikelets packed closer together. Compact wheats are often regarded as subspecies rather than species in their own right (thus T. aestivum subsp. compactum).

References 
  

Wheat cultivars
Medicinal plants of Asia
Plants described in 1753